Freakshow is a DVD/CD set released by The Killer Barbies in 2004 on Drakkar Records. The CD contains a bonus picture gallery including over 80 pictures.

DVD track listing 
Intro
"I Wanna Live in Tromaville"
"Lovekiller"
In India
"Freakshow"
"Solo Para Ti"
"Lost Control"
"Gente Pez"
At the Studio
Making of "They Come From Mars"
"They Come From Mars"
In New York
"Downtown"
Making of "Dracula vs. Killer Barbies"
Making of "Candy"
"Candy"
In Tokyo
Live at Rockpalast & Ringfest
"Have Some Fun (To Joey)"
"El Resplandor"
"Comic Book"

CD track listing 
"Going Wild"
"Skulls" Misfits cover written by Glenn Danzig
"Fui Yo"
"Mas Alla"
"Voy a Robar Tu Amor"
"Bajo Mi Piel"
"Candy (Spanish Version)"

2004 live albums
2004 video albums
Live video albums
The Killer Barbies albums